This article lists rivers by their average discharge measured in descending order of their water flow rate. It can be thought of as a list of the biggest rivers on earth, measured by a specific metric. 

For context, the volume of an Olympic-size swimming pool is 2,500 m3. The average flow rate at the mouth of the Amazon is sufficient to fill more than 83 such pools each second. The average flow of all the rivers in this list adds up to 1,192,134 m3/s.

See also
 Lists of rivers
 List of drainage basins by area
 List of rivers by dissolved load
 List of rivers by length
 List of rivers of India by discharge
 List of U.S. rivers by discharge
 List of waterfalls by flow rate

Notes

References

Discharge